The United States census of 1990, conducted by the Census Bureau, was the first census to be directed by a woman, Barbara Everitt Bryant. It determined the resident population of the United States to be 248,709,873, an increase of 9.8 percent over the 226,545,805 persons enumerated during the 1980 census.

Approximately 16 percent of households received a "long form" of the 1990 census, which contained more than 100 questions. Full documentation on the 1990 census, including census forms and a procedural history, is available from the Integrated Public Use Microdata Series.

It was the first census to designate "Native Hawaiian and Other Pacific Islander" as a racial group separate from Asians.

To increase black participation in the 1990 United States census, the bureau recruited Bill Cosby, Magic Johnson, Alfre Woodard, and Miss America Debbye Turner as spokespeople. The Integrated Public Use Microdata Series. Aggregate data for small areas, together with electronic boundary files, can be downloaded from the National Historical Geographic Information System. Personally identifiable information will be available in 2062.

This was the first census since 1880 in which Chicago was not the second-largest city, having been overtaken by Los Angeles. As of the 2020 census, Los Angeles has remained the nation's second-largest city.

State rankings

Reapportionment 
The results of the 1990 census determined the number of seats that each state receives in the United States House of Representatives starting with the 1992 elections. Consequently, this affected the number of votes each state has in the Electoral College for the 1992 presidential election.

Because of population changes, twenty-one states had changes in their number of seats. Eight states gained at least one seat, and thirteen states lost at least one seat. The final result involved 19 seats being switched.

City rankings

References

External links 

 U.S. Census Bureau 1990 Census page
 Historic US Census data
 Statistical Abstract of the United States: 1990 Contains 1990 census results
 Booknotes interview with Sam Roberts on Who We Are: A Portrait of America, June 19, 1994.
 1991 U.S Census Report (contains 1990 census results)

Census
United States
United States census